Goodale Mountain is a  mountain summit located one mile east of the crest of the Sierra Nevada mountain range, in Inyo County of northern California. It is situated less than two miles southeast of Taboose Pass in the John Muir Wilderness, on land managed by Inyo National Forest. It ranks as the 218th highest peak in California.

History
The mountain's name was officially adopted by the United States Board on Geographic Names to commemorate Thomas Jackson Goodale (1830–1894), an Owens Valley pioneer who had an adobe house at nearby Fish Springs. The first ascent of the summit was made July 23, 1939, by Allan A. MacRae, Albion J. Whitney, and Norman Clyde who is credited with 130 first ascents, most of which were in the Sierra Nevada.

Climate
According to the Köppen climate classification system, Goodale Mountain has an alpine climate. Most weather fronts originate in the Pacific Ocean, and travel east toward the Sierra Nevada mountains. As fronts approach, they are forced upward by the peaks, causing them to drop their moisture in the form of rain or snowfall onto the range (orographic lift). Precipitation runoff from this mountain drains into Goodale and Taboose Creeks, thence Owens Valley.

See also
 
 List of mountain peaks of California

References

External links
 Weather forecast: Goodale Mountain

Inyo National Forest
Mountains of Inyo County, California
Mountains of the John Muir Wilderness
North American 3000 m summits
Mountains of Northern California
Sierra Nevada (United States)